is a 721.4 meter high mountain in Sasayama, Hyōgo, Japan. Another name is Tanba-Fuji, literally, "Mount Fuji in Tanba Province". This mountain is one of the Hyōgo 50 mountains, and Kinki 100 mountains.

Outline 
Mount Shirakami is one of the most famous mountains in Tamba Highland, well known for its good shape like the famous Mount Fuji. This mountain is an independent mountain in this area, and visitors can enjoy the almost 360-degree panorama view from the top. This mountain is the source of Mukogawa River.

Religion and History 

Mount Shirakami was an object of worship of the people in this area with Mount Matsuo. This mountain is located near an old route from Osaka to Tajima Province, or Kyoto to Harima Province, so the good-shape of the mountain has attracted many people in the history.
After the Battle of Ichi-no-Tani in the 12th century, a legend said that one of a wife of the lost samurai of Heike, lived on the foot of the mountain and a found her husband.

Access 
 Furuichi Station of Fukuchiyama Line
 Sasayamaguchi Station of Fukuchiyama Line

References 
 The Geographical Survey Institute in Japan
 "Shinban Furusato Hyogo 50 San", Hyōgoken Sangaku Renmei

Shirakami